The Virtual Bride (lit. The Eccentric Daughter-in-Law), is a 2015 South Korean drama series starring Kim Dasom, Go Doo-shim and Ryu Soo-young. It aired on KBS2 from August 17 to September 22, 2015 on Mondays and Tuesdays at 21:55 for 12 episodes.

Plot
In order to boost her flagging popularity, former idol group singer Oh In-young (Kim Dasom) agrees to appear in a television reality show that pairs up fake mothers- and daughters-in-law. In-young's partner is Yang Choon-ja (Go Doo-shim), the matriarch of a long-standing traditional clan, and they end up hating each other on the show. But as fate would have it, the two later end up becoming mother and daughter-in-law for real.

Cast
Kim Da-som as Oh In-young
Go Doo-shim as Yang Choon-ja
Ryu Soo-young as Cha Myeong-seok
Kwak Hee-sung as Cha Dong-seok
Kim Yoon-seo as Kim Se-mi
Kim Seong-hwan as Cha Il-goo
Park Woong as Cha Joo-bok
Baek Ok-dam as Lee Ha-ji
Kim Bo-yeon as Jang Mi-hee
Ki Tae-young as Kang Joon-soo
Son Eun-seo as Cha Young-ah
Lee Moon-hee as Choi Soon-hee
Lee Seung-woo as Cha San
Kyung Joon as Bae Yong-joon
Lee Yong-joo as Oh Sang-sik
Jung Da-sol as Heo Soon-jung

Title changes
Its early working titles include Killing Mother-in-Law and Taming Mother-in-Law.

Ratings

See also
We Got Married
The Great Marriage

References

External links
  
 
 

Korean Broadcasting System television dramas
2015 South Korean television series debuts
Korean-language television shows
2015 South Korean television series endings
Television series by RaemongRaein